The Gward is the name of a series of .38-caliber Polish revolvers designed by engineers from the state-run Wojskowa Akademia Techniczna (H. Głowicki, W. Koperski, S. Ciepielski) and Kombinat Maszyn Włókienniczych "Wifama" factory (R. Chełmicki, T. Podgórski, J. Dudek) for the Polish Ministry of Internal Affairs.

A pre production trial series of Gward revolvers were manufactured in 1992. Series production of the Guard revolver was never launched due to financial problems of the "Wifima" factory.

References

Revolvers of Poland
.38 Special firearms